Benjamin Yeung may refer to:

 Yang Rong (businessman) (born 1957), exiled Chinese tycoon
 Benjamin Yeung (Canadian businessman), Hong-born Canadian businessman

See also
Benjamin Young (disambiguation)